Krumbach may refer to:

Places in Austria
Krumbach, Lower Austria
Krumbach, Vorarlberg
a part of Sankt Oswald ob Eibiswald, Styria

Places in Germany
Krumbach, Bavaria, in the Günzburg district, Bavaria
Krumbach, Swabia (district), a former district whose capital was Krumbach, Bavaria
a borough of Asbach, in the Neuwied district, Rhineland-Palatinate
a borough of Amberg, in the Amberg-Sulzbach district, Bavaria
a borough of Bad Saulgau, in the Sigmaringen district, Baden-Württemberg 
a borough of Biebertal, in the Gießen district, Hesse
a borough of Fürth, in the Bergstraße district, Hesse
a borough of Hohenpolding, in the Erding district, Bavaria
a borough of Illmensee, in the Sigmaringen district, Baden-Württemberg 
a borough of Kirchroth, in the Straubing-Bogen district, Bavaria
a borough of Kißlegg, in the Ravensburg district, Baden-Württemberg 
a borough of Lichtenau, in the Mittweida district, Saxony
a borough of Limbach (Neckar-Odenwald), in the Neckar-Odenwald district, Baden-Württemberg
a borough of Sauldorf, in the Sigmaringen district, Baden-Württemberg
a borough of Seßlach, in the Coburg district, Bavaria
a borough of Tettnang, in the Bodensee district, Baden-Württemberg

Rivers in Germany
Krumbach (Kammel), in Bavaria, tributary of the Kammel

See also
Krumbacher